Major-General Thomas Heward Acton,  (12 June 1917 – 22 January 1977) was a British Army officer.

Military career
Acton was commissioned into the Rifle Brigade (The Prince Consort's Own) in the late 1930s and was mentioned in dispatches for his service during the Second World War. After the war, he became commander of 126th Infantry Brigade in October 1963, General Officer Commanding South West District in February 1967 and then Commander of Land Forces in Northern Ireland in February 1970 during the Troubles. He went on to be Chief of Staff at HQ Northern Ireland in July 1970 before retiring in May 1971.

He was appointed a Commander of the Order of the British Empire in the 1963 Birthday Honours.

References

1917 births
1977 deaths
British Army major generals
Commanders of the Order of the British Empire
Rifle Brigade officers
British Army personnel of World War II
British military personnel of The Troubles (Northern Ireland)